Ahmad Domocao "Domie" Alangadi Alonto (August 1, 1914 – December 11, 2002) was a Muslim-Filipino lawyer, educator, author, traditional leader, and Islamic figure from Lanao del Sur.

He served as a Senator of the Philippines and was elected as a delegate in the 1971 Constitutional Convention and 1986 Philippine Constitutional Commission.

In 1988, he was awarded with the prestigious King Faisal Prize for Service to Islam.

Early life and education 
Dr. Domocao Alonto was born on August 1, 1914, in Ditsaan-Ramain, Lanao del Sur. He was the eldest son of the six children of Senator Sultan Alauya Alonto of Ramain and Bai Hajja Amina Bariga Alangadi, a sixth-generation descendant of Sultan Muhammad Dipatuan Kudarat of Maguindanao.

At an early age, he was tutored by his mother on the fundamentals of Islam. He then attended a government school in Lanao from 1921 to 1931 for his primary and secondary education. He earned his Fellowship in Arts, BA, and Doctorate in Law at the University of the Philippines in Manila, where he was also a member of the Upsilon Sigma Phi fraternity. He passed the Bar Examination in 1938.

His siblings - Hadja Naima Alonto; Abdul Ghafur Madki Alonto; Masiding Alonto, Sr.; Tarhata Alonto-Lucman, and Madrigal Alonto - were all prominent leaders in Lanao during the latter half of the 20th century. Abdul Ghafur Madki Alonto served as Governor and Ambassador, and Tarhata Alonto served as Governor. His Brother-in-Law, Bae Tarhata's husband Rashid Lucman also served as Congressman.

Political career 
Alonto started working as a classroom teacher in Lanao del Sur. He then became a confidential writer for the National Information Board and the Department of Interior. At the onset of World War II, he was commissioned as a First Lieutenant in the Philippine Army, 81st Division, United States Armed Forces in the Far East (USAFFE).

Japanese Period 
During the Japanese occupation of the Philippines (1942–1945), Alonto served as the municipal mayor of Dansalan (now Marawi City). He then became the governor of Lanao Province during the caretaker government under Japanese rule.

While serving under the Japanese government, Alonto secretly supported the underground resistance movement against the Japanese. The Japanese authorities did not harbor any suspicion towards him since he occupied key positions in their government. It was during this time that he was able to have a broader grasp of the state of Maranao society in general.

After the war, he was appointed as Presidential Assistant and Adviser to the Office of the President of the Republic of the Philippines from 1947 to 1948.

Congress 

Alonto was first elected representative of Lanao del Sur in 1953. During his term, he chaired a Special Committee created by the House of Representatives to find a definite solution to the so-called “Mindanao Problem”. In 1954, he founded the Mindanao Islamic University (Jāmīatu al-Fīlībbīn al-Islāmi), the first Islamic university in the Philippine archipelago.

From 1955 to 1961, he served as a member of the Senate under the Nacionalista Party. During his term, he authored the bills establishing the Mindanao Development Authority, the Mindanao State University (MSU), the law providing for more autonomous local governments in relatively backward rural areas, and the law creating the Commission on National Integration. Alonto also amended the Civil Service Law of 1959, recognizing the Islamic holidays ‘Īid al-Fitr and ‘Īid al-Adhā.

Alonto also authored the law (enacted as Republic Act No. 2228) dividing the old Lanao Province into Lanao del Norte and Lanao del Sur. Each province was provided with congressional representatives.

As a legislator, he advocated for the understanding between Muslim Filipinos and their Christian brothers and preached for non-violence and peaceful coexistence. He was also a strong advocate for the passage of nationalization laws and co-authored the Retail Nationalization Law, subsequently defending it from repeal until incontrovertible proof was shown that the law was adverse to the national interest.

Kamlon Rebellion 
After World War II, Hadji Kamlon launched a bloody upheaval against government forces which lasted for eight years ending in 1952. Growing tensions between Muslims and Christian over land attracted the national interest of which a Special Committee in 1954 was constituted by Congress. The Committee, also known as the “Alonto Committee” was composed of Lanao Congressman, Domocao Alonto as chairman, Cotabato Congressman Luminog Mangelen, and Sulu Congressman Ombra Amilbangsa. The Committee concluded that “the Moros must be made to feel that they were an integral part of the Philippine nation and this aim must be achieved through a comprehensive approach covering economic, social, moral political, and educational developments”.

The conclusion reached by the Special Committee paved the way for the creation of the Commission on National Integration (CNI); Mindanao Development Authority (MDA); and Mindanao State University (MSU).

Bandung Conference 
In 1955, a meeting of non-aligned nations who refused to partake in the Cold War was held in Bandung, Indonesia. Along with Foreign Secretary Carlos P. Romulo, Domocao Alonto was the only Muslim delegate from the Philippines. It was in this meeting that he met Gamal Abdel Nasser of Egypt, Sukarno of Indonesia, and Tungku Abdul Rahman of Malaysia.

His participation in the conference enabled him to establish linkages and contacts in the Middle East. The Muslim world was made aware of the presence of Muslims in the islands of Mindanao and Sulu. As a result, he got scholarships for Muslim Filipinos coming from Mindanao and Sulu at the Cairo Military Academy, Al Azhar University in Egypt. Among these students was the young Salamat Hashim who would, later on, establish the Moro Islamic Liberation Front (MILF).

Jabiddah Massacre 
March 17, 1968, sixty-four Moro military trainees were massacred by their military handlers on the island of Corregidor (Jabbidah Massacre). As a result, there was an outpour of protest among the Muslim communities around the Philippines demanding for justice. In Lanao del Sur, Domocao Alonto established the Ansar El Islam (Helpers of Islam). Accordingly, “it is a mass movement for the preservation and development of Islam in the Philippines.” The advocacy of Ansar El Islam would, later on, inspire the creation of the Moro National Liberation Front (MNLF) and the Moro Islamic Liberation Front (MILF).

Martial Law Regime 
Domocao Alonto joined the opposition movement when dictator Ferdinand Marcos declared Martial Law in the Philippines. In 1983, a series of meetings was held at the house of his nephew Abul Khayr Alonto to discuss the plight of the Muslims during the dictatorship. Together with Salipada K. Pendatun, Mamintal Tamano, Abul Khayr Alonto, Abraham Rasul, Prof. Joel delos Santos, Prof. Ibrahim Mama-o, Al Marin Tillah, Robert Alonto, Saidamen Pangarungan and Bai Norhata Alonto, the meetings resulted to the signing of the “Manifesto of the Moslems of the Philippines Supporting the Call for National Reconciliation and Unity”. The group threatened to reassert the old claim for a separate “Moro Nation” in Mindanao “unless national reconciliation with justice for all is speedily effected”. They also referred to the assassinated opposition leader Benigno Aquino Jr., as a martyr who supported the Muslim Filipinos’ demand for greater autonomy.

Alonto was also instrumental in bringing the issue about the plight of Muslim-Filipinos to the world stage. His extensive network with other Muslim countries would eventually lay foundations for the involvement of the Organization of Islamic Conference (OIC) in the Mindanao peace process.

Constitutional Conventions 
Alonto represented Lanao del Sur during the 1971 Constitutional Convention.

Alonto then served as Assistant Floor Leader for the 1987 Constitutional Commission. He proposed the addition of the Autonomous Region in Muslim Mindanao (ARMM) in the 1987 Constitution of the Philippines.

In both conventions, he advocated for the accommodation of the Muslim-Filipinos in the larger nation-building program of the national government. While he believed in the argument of the Moro secessionist movements that there are legitimate injustices committed against the Muslims, he favored the exhaustion of all the available legitimate means to resolve the conflict. He championed meaningful autonomy for Muslim Mindanao and Sulu as a remedy to resolving the Mindanao problem.

Death and legacy 

Dr. Domocao Alonto died on December 11, 2002, in his home in Marawi City after a brief bout with cancer.

Alonto is known for his contributions to the spread and development of Islamic thought in the Philippines. He founded the Mindanao Islamic University which provides education for both Muslims and Christians. He also founded the Mindanao Mosque and Islamic Center in Marawi City, the largest of its kind in the Philippines, and the Rajah Solaiman Mosque (Masjid Solaymaniah) located in Binangonan, Rizal.

He was a founding member of the Makkah-based World Muslim League, the Executive Council of the World Islamic Congress and the Central Council of the International Organization of Islamic Universities, and other Islamic organization based in the Philippines. He is the only Filipino to receive the King Faisal Foundation Award for Service to Islam.

It was his advocacy for Muslim recognition that inspired activists to form the Moro National Liberation Front (MNLF) and later on the Moro Islamic Liberation Front (MILF).

In 2005, Alonto was included in “100 great Muslim Leaders of the 20th Century”, published by the Institute of Objective Studies in New Delhi, India.

Descendants 
His son, Adnan Villaluna Alonto, is presently the Ambassador to Saudi Arabia under the administration of President Rodrigo Duterte. His daughter, Bedjoria Soraya Alonto Adiong was elected as Governor of Lanao del Sur in 2016. His son, Ahmad Engracia Alonto Jr., served as the President of Mindanao State University from 1987 to 1992. Both his grandson, Ansaruddin Alonto Adiong and Yasser Alonto Balindong are serving as incumbent members of the House of Representatives, representing the 1st and 2nd district of Lanao del Sur, respectively. The incumbent Governor of Lanao del Sur, Mamintal Adiong Jr., and BTA Member of Parliament Ziaur-Rahman Alonto Adiong are also his grandsons.

References 

University of the Philippines alumni
Senators of the 4th Congress of the Philippines
Filipino Muslims
Moro people
1914 births
2002 deaths
Politicians from Lanao del Sur
20th-century Filipino lawyers
Members of the Philippine Constitutional Commission of 1986